The Makelan Corporation is an American aircraft manufacturer based in New Braunfels, Texas. The company provides kits for the Hatz Classic biplane design.

J. W. (Jeff) Shoemake is the company owner, while  Sylvia Shoemake is manager.

The company's sole product is a development of the Hatz CB-1, that was designed by John Hatz in the 1960s. The Hatz Classic is an improved model with additional cockpit room, designed by Billy Dawson of Seguin, Texas in the 1990s. Dawson's prototype first flew in 1996 and won several awards, including Reserve Grand Champion - Plans Built at Airventure 1996, Grand Champion Experimental and Reserve Grand Champion Open Cockpit - Biplane at the 1997 Biplane Expo and Grand Champion - Plans Built at AirVenture 1997.

By 1998 the company reported that five Hatz Classic kits had been sold and three aircraft were completed and flying. In September 2014 twelve examples were registered in the United States with the Federal Aviation Administration.

Aircraft

References

External links
 Official website archive

Aircraft manufacturers of the United States
Companies based in New Braunfels, Texas
Homebuilt aircraft